The first USS Guinevere (SP-512) was a United States Navy patrol vessel in commission from 1917 to 1918.

Guinevere was built in 1908 as a private steam and sail yacht of the same name by George Lawley & Son at Neponset, Massachusetts. On 10 June 1917, the U.S. Navy acquired her from her owner, Edgar Palmer of New York City, for use as a section patrol vessel during World War I. She was commissioned as USS Guinevere (SP-512) on 20 July 1917.

Guinevere departed Coaling Station Newport at Newport, Rhode Island, on 1 August 1917 bound for St. John's, Dominion of Newfoundland; the Azores; and Brest, France. Arriving at Brest on 29 August 1917, she commenced patrols of the French coast and began escorting convoys to Quiberon, Ushant, Lorient, and St. Nazaire, France.

Guinevere ran aground and was wrecked off the French coast on 26 January 1918 with no loss of life. Her wreck was sold for scrapping to the French firm Societe Americaine de Sauvetage on 30 June 1919.

References

Department of the Navy Naval History and Heritage Command Online Library of Selected Images: U.S. Navy Ships USS Guinevere (SP-512), 1917-1918

Patrol vessels of the United States Navy
World War I patrol vessels of the United States
Ships built in Boston
1908 ships
Individual yachts
Maritime incidents in 1918
Ships sunk with no fatalities
Shipwrecks of France
World War I shipwrecks in the Atlantic Ocean